Hoheria lyallii, the mountain lacebark, is a species of flowering plant in the mallow family Malvaceae, native to New Zealand, where it grows on drier mountainous areas of South Island - mainly in eastern Canterbury and Marlborough. The Latin specific epithet lyallii honours the Scottish naturalist and explorer David Lyall (1817-1895). In cultivation in the UK this plant has gained the Royal Horticultural Society’s Award of Garden Merit. Hoheria lyallii and Hoheria glabrata (which has a similar appearance) are known in Māori as houi, and were likely used as textiles by South Island Māori.

References

Trees of New Zealand
lyallii
Taxa named by William Jackson Hooker